Kasigluk Airport  is a state-owned public-use airport located two nautical miles (4 km) south of the central business district of Kasigluk, in the Bethel Census Area of the U.S. state of Alaska.

As per Federal Aviation Administration records, this airport had 4,001 passenger boardings (enplanements) in calendar year 2007, a decrease of 5% from the 4,218 enplanements in 2006.

Facilities 
Kasigluk Airport has one runway designated 17/35 with a gravel surface measuring 3,000 by 60 feet (914 x 18 m). The runway was previously 1,950 by 50 feet.

Airlines and destinations 

Prior to its bankruptcy and cessation of all operations, Ravn Alaska served the airport from multiple locations.

Top destinations

References

External links
 FAA Alaska airport diagram (GIF)

Airports in the Bethel Census Area, Alaska